Anne Marguérite, Baroness Hyde de Neuville (born Henriette Anne Marguérite Joséphine Rouillé de Marigny, May 10, 1771 - September 14, 1849 ) was a French aristocrat and self-taught watercolorist and artist. She is best known for her drawings of people and landscapes she encountered in her travels in America during the first decades of the 19th century. She left behind a sizable body of work of over 200 watercolors and drawings.

Early life 
Anne Marguérite married Jean-Guillaume, baron Hyde de Neuville, on August 23, 1794 in Sancerre when she was twenty-three and Jean-Guiillaume was eighteen years old. Jean-Guillaume, a French Royalist was accused of participating in a plot to assassinate Napoleon Bonaparte in 1800. The couple's property was seized and they went into hiding for several years. In 1805, Anne-Maguérite traveled to Vienna to meet with Napoleon in an attempt to reclaim their estate. Napoleon finally agreed but only if they went into exile in the United States.

The couple arrived in the United States in 1807 and traveled throughout the Northeast. They spent their winters in New York City and established the École Économique, a school for French refugee children in 1808 and which was incorporated in 1810. They purchased land outside of New Brunswick, New Jersey in 1811 where they raised Merino sheep.

Following the abdication of Napoleon in 1814, the couple returned to France. For their loyality to the monarchy, Jean-Guillaume was named French Ambassador to the United States in 1816. The couple lived in Washington, D.C. until 1822 when they again returned to France where they remained for the rest of their lives.

Career 

Not much is known about Anne Marguérite's early years, but like many young girls of her status, she most likely received lessons in draftsmanship. Based on the body of her artwork left behind, it appears she began drawing in earnest around the age of eighteen years. Her early drawings were primarily portraits of family members. Her preferred medium was chalk and graphite during this period.

When Anne Marguérite and Jean-Guillaume went into exile and were still in Europe, they used their time to document the places they stayed and saw. While Jean-Guillaume documented his daily life in writing, Anne Marguérite kept a visual diary of her life in exile. Shortly before they came to the United States in 1807, she began incorporating watercolors into her drawing repertoire, using watercolor for more finished works.

Once in the United States, she used her drawing skills to document her experiences of America. Her sketches of the Hudson River are among some of the earliest documented drawings of the area. Anne Marguérite drew prolifically during her first stay in America, from sketches of friends' homes, to street scenes in the cities they stayed, to portraits of the people around her, including Native Americans, working people, African Americans, and servants.

On the couple's second stay in America, while residing in Washington, D.C. they were the first diplomatic couple to reside at the Decatur House. While she did not have as much time to draw, when she did, Anne Marguérite documented her developing neighborhood, President's Square which is now called Lafayette Square.

Death and legacy 
Anne Marguérite and Jean-Guillaume never had any children. Anne Marguérite died in 1849 at the age of 78 years.

Two exhibitions have been put on exploring the Anne-Marguérite's life and artwork. The first was in 1984 curated by the Zimmerli Art Museum entitled, Baroness Hyde de Neuville: Sketches of America, 1807-1822. In 2019 the New York Historical Society held another exhibition of her work entitled, Artist in Exile: The Visual Diary of 

Baroness Hyde de Neville.

Her personal papers are held at Princeton University.

Further reading 

 da Costa Nunes, Jadviga M. & Ferris Olin, Baroness Hyde de Neuville: Sketches of America, 1807-1822, Zimmerli Art Museum, 1984
 Olson, Roberta, J.M., Artist in Exile: The Visual Diary of Baroness Hyde de Neuville, GILES, 2019

Works 
 View of Utica from the hotel September, 1807, New York Public Library
 House of Dupont de Nemours Angelica (NY) 1808, National Museum of Franco-American cooperation, Blérancourt
 Bridewell, and Charity-School, Broadway, Opposite Chamber Street 1808, The Phelps Stokes Collection
 The Moreau House, 1809, Museum of Fine Arts, Boston 
Vue d'amboy et du steam-boat The steamboat the Rariton, 1809, New York Public Library
 Corner of Greenwich Street 1810, The Phelps Stokes Collection
 Economical School 1810-1814, Historic New Orleans Collection
 La Bergerie Farm Hyde Neuville Angelica (NY) 1814, National Museum of Franco-American Cooperation, Blérancourt
Le coin de F. Street Washington vis-à-vis nôtre maison été de 1817, New York Public Library
Eleutherian Mills, c. 1817, Hagley Museum and Library
 The House of James Madison to Montpellier, Virginia 1818, Blérancourt, National Museum of Franco-American Cooperation 
 Home in Washington in 1818 to the French ambassador, Baron Hyde de Neuville, National Museum of Franco-American Cooperation, Blérancourt 
 View of Washington City, 1820, New York Public Library
 White House, ca. 1820, John Anderton collection

Selected works in the collection of the New-York Historical Society:
 Seated African American Scrubwoman, 1807–1822 
 Baroness Hyde De Neuville's Cabin on the Eurydice,1816
 The Hyde De Neuville Cabin on the Eurydice, 1816
 sketches from the Economical School Series, 1810-1814
 Portrait of a Cherokee Man, 1820
 Hudson Highlands from Newburgh Bay, 1807
 The Cottage, 1813
 Portrait of an Indian Chief, Red Jacket (c.1758-1830?), 1807
 Mary, a Squaw of the Oneida Tribe, 1807
 Portrait of Seneca Squaw and Papoose, Western New York, 1808
 Incomplete Bridge, Palatine, New York, 1808
 Portrait of an Indian Chief (Chief of the Little Osage [after St. Memin]), c.1811-13
 Oneida Family, 1807
 Portrait of an American Indian Girl of Ballston Springs, New York, 1807
 Fair American Indian Man of the Buffalo Tribe, Canisteo, New York, 1808
 Portrait of Peter of Buffalo, Tonawanda, New York, possibly chief Tall Peter, or Peter Blacksnake, 1807
 Dutch Houses on State Street, Albany, New York, 1807
 Self-Portrait, c.1805-10
 St. John's Church, President's Square, Washington D.C., 1822

References

External links

1771 births
1849 deaths
19th-century French painters
19th-century French women artists
French baronesses
French expatriates in the United States
French watercolourists
French women painters
People from Cher (department)
Women watercolorists